The 443d Airlift Wing is an inactive unit of the United States Air Force. Its last assignment was with Air Mobility Command, being stationed at Altus Air Force Base, Oklahoma. It was inactivated on October 1, 1992.

History
 For additional history and lineage, see 443d Operations Group
In 1949, the 443d Troop Carrier Wing, Medium was established and trained as a Reserve troop-carrier wing under supervision of the 2596th Air Force Reserve Training Center, June 1949 – April 1951.

The 443d was brought to active duty at Donaldson AFB, South Carolina on August 9, 1951, as a training wing by Tactical Air Command. For almost two years, the 443d participated in tactical exercises in operations, training troop-carrier aircrews using C-46 Commandos for assignment to the Far East, and worked closely with other troop-carrier groups to test and evaluate new troop-carrier doctrine and procedures. With the nearing end of the Korean War, the 443d was inactivated on January 8, 1953.

In January 1966, Military Airlift Command (MAC) reactivated the 443d at Tinker AFB, Oklahoma, replacing the inactivated Military Air Transport Service 1707th Air Transport Wing, Heavy.  The 443d became the primary USAF wing charged with training air and ground crews of C-124 Globemaster II and the new C-141 Starlifter heavy transports, while simultaneously maintaining a capability to perform airlift operations worldwide.

With the retirement of the prop-driven C-124 Globemaster II from active service, training diminished in 1967 and ceased in 1968, being replaced by training air and ground crews on the new C-5 Galaxy, a very heavy-lift transport, in 1969.  The wing moved from Tinker AFB, Oklahoma to Altus AFB, Oklahoma, in 1969. The wing performed this training mission until 1992 when C-5 and C-141 training was consolidated after the end of the Cold War.

Air Mobility Command reorganized Air Force Airlift units in 1992, and the 443d was inactivated on October 1, 1992, as part of the Air Force Heritage program, where notable units were retained and reassigned after the Cold War.

The new 97th Air Mobility Wing, a former Eighth Air Force World War II bombardment group, and later Strategic Air Command bomb wing, absorbed the personnel, equipment and aircraft of the 443d upon its inactivation in an administrative transfer.

Lineage
 Established as 443d Troop Carrier Wing, Medium, on May 10, 1949
 Activated in the Reserve on June 27, 1949
 Ordered to active service on May 1, 1951
 Inactivated on January 8, 1953
 Redesignated 443d Military Airlift Wing, Training, and activated, on December 27, 1965
 Organized on January 8, 1966
 Inactivated October 1, 1992, personnel and equipment assumed by the new 97th Air Mobility Wing
 Converted to provisional status and redesignated 443d Air Expeditionary Wing on 12 June 2002

Assignments
 Twelfth Air Force, 27 June 1949
 Fourteenth Air Force, 1 July 1950
 Tactical Air Command, May 2, 1951
 Eighteenth Air Force, June 1, 1951 – January 8, 1953
 Military Air Transport Service (later, Military Airlift Command), December 27, 1965
 Twenty-Second Air Force, April 1, 1973 – June 1, 1992
 Air Mobility Command to activate or inactivate as needed on 12 June 2002

Stations
 Hensley Field, Texas, June 27, 1949
 Donaldson AFB, South Carolina, August 9, 1951 – January 8, 1953
 Tinker AFB, Oklahoma, January 8, 1966
 Altus AFB, Oklahoma, May 5, 1969 – October 1, 1992

Components
 Groups
 443d Troop Carrier Group: June 27, 1949 – January 8, 1953
 443d Operations Group: October 1, 1991 – October 1, 1992

Squadrons
 56th Military Airlift Squadron (Training): January 8, 1966 – October 1, 1992 (C-124A/C 1966-68, and, C-5A/B 1969-92)
 57th Military Airlift Squadron (Training): January 8, 1966 – October 1, 1992 (C-141A/B)

Aircraft Assigned
 C-46 Commando, 1949–1952
 C-119 Flying Boxcar, 1952–1953
 C-124 Globemaster II, 1966–1968
 C-141 Starlifter, 1966–1992
 C-5 Galaxy, 1969–1992

Notes

References

 Ravenstein, Charles A. (1984). Air Force Combat Wings Lineage and Honors Histories 1947–1977. Maxwell AFB, Alabama: Office of Air Force History. .
 Rogers, Brian (2005). United States Air Force Unit Designations Since 1978. Hinkley, England: Midland Publications. .

0443
Military units and formations established in 1965